Lunathi "Lulu" Mdatyulwa (born April 12, 1997) is a South African professional footballer who plays for Richards Bay F.C.  He was born in Hout Bay and grew up in the township of Imizamo Yethu.  Mdatyulwa speaks Xhosa and English.

Youth career 
In 2007, Mdatyulwa had a successful trial with Ajax Cape Town and subsequently joined their Under 12 Academy team.  After impressing in youth tournaments he caught the attention of numerous clubs, most notably Mamelodi Sundowns, who he elected to join in 2013.

Senior career 
After a brief spell with Cape Town City F.C. and impressing for a young Ke Yona side, Mdatyulwa signed a three deal with Chippa United In January 2019, he joined Witbank Spurs on a two-year deal. He currently plays for Richards Bay F.C. in the National First Division.

International career 
In 2014, Mdatyulwa was called up to the South Africa U20 squad to face Malawi in a friendly

Style of play 
Mdatyulwa plays as an attacking midfielder and is known for his skill, touch and creativity. In 2015 Mamelodi Sundowns coach Jan Melombo stated “Lunathi is an influential player.  He controls the team which is a skill that is needed as a Midfielder. He is a visionary player and brings every team member into the game.“

Media 
Mdatyulwa appears in Football Manager 2020, a football management simulation video game developed by Sports Interactive and published by Sega.  He appears in each updated version up to and including Football Manager 2023 (officially abbreviated as FM23).

Career statistics

References

External links 
Lunathi Mdatyulwa at Soccerway.com

1997 births
Living people
Association football midfielders
Chippa United F.C. players
Witbank Spurs F.C. players
Richards Bay F.C. players
South Africa under-20 international soccer players
South African soccer players